Mr. Natural may refer to:
 LSD
 Mr. Natural (Stanley Turrentine album), 1964
 Mr. Natural (character), a Robert Crumb comic book character, first appearing in 1967 
 Mr. Natural (Bee Gees album), 1974
 "Mr. Natural" (song), a 1974 song by The Bee Gees from that album

See also
 Mr. B Natural, a 1950s short film and its title character, spoofed by Mystery Science Theater 3000